Saint-Florent-des-Bois is a former commune in the Vendée department in the Pays de la Loire region in western France. On 1 January 2016, it was merged into the new commune of Rives-de-l'Yon.

It is located on the periphery of La Roche-sur-Yon.

Twin towns
Saint-Florent-des-Bois is twinned with the village of Silkstone in South Yorkshire, England

Geography
The river Yon forms part of the commune's western border.

See also
Communes of the Vendée department

References

Former communes of Vendée
Populated places disestablished in 2016